Nicolai Riise Madsen (born 14 August 1993) is a Danish footballer who plays for Rishøj Boldklub as a defender. He played one match for HB Køge in the Danish Superliga during the 2011-12 season.

References

1993 births
Living people
Danish men's footballers
Association football defenders
HB Køge players
Danish Superliga players